The Scottish Rally Championship is a rallying series run throughout Scotland over the course of a year, that comprises seven gravel rallies and one tarmac event. Points are awarded to the top placed drivers and the driver scoring the highest number of points over the season is declared Champion

The 2010 season began in the snow-covered forest tracks around Inverness on 20 February, with the season finale taking place around Perth on 25 September.

The 2010 Scottish rally Championship was won by David Bogie after winning six of the eight events.

2010 Calendar
In 2010 there was 8 events on a variety of surfaces.

2010 Results

Drivers Points Classification

Points are awarded to the highest placed registered drivers on each event as follows: 30, 28, 27, 26, and so on down to 1 point. At the end of the season, competitors nominate their best 6 scores out of the 8 events as their final overall Championship score.

References

External links
 Scottish Rally Championship Homepage
 RSAC Scottish Rally Homepage

Scottish Rally Championship seasons
Scottish Rally Championship
2010 in rallying